Cacyparis insolitata is a moth of the family Nolidae first described by Francis Walker in 1862. It is found in India and Sri Lanka.

References

Moths of Asia
Moths described in 1862
Nolidae